The Birks Building (formerly known as the YMCA Building) is a four-storey building located on the corner of Portage Avenue and Smith Street in Winnipeg, Manitoba.

History
Completed in 1901, it was originally built for Winnipeg YMCA. The land had been purchased by YMCA in June 1890. Designed by local architect George Browne, the building cost $88,500 and was officially opened January 18, 1901. As it was when it was created for YMCA, the building included a rotunda, reading rooms, parlour, a 150-seat lecture hall, 600-seat auditorium, running track, gymnasium, recreation room, boys' quarters, two meeting halls, classrooms, a library, boardroom and furnished bedrooms, showers, lockers and two bowling alleys. The building also featured Winnipeg's first indoor pool. The first floor featured retail space, which was home to a variety of tenants over the years, including Canadian General Electric (1900-1905), Forrester and Hatcher, Pianos (1900-1904), Great West Permanent Loan and Savings (1904-1906), and the New York Hair Store (1905-1910). The entire fourth floor was home to over 20 dormitories, along with a kitchen, sitting rooms and a common bathroom.

Birks, a company that designs, manufactures and retails jewellery, timepieces, silverware and gifts, acquired the building in September 1912. The building was significantly reworked in 1912 to accommodate the jewellery store. The rework added distinctive Renaissance Revival palace facades designed by Percy Nobbs, featuring terracotta, granite, bronze and Tyndall stone. Above the third-floor openings are six terracotta medallions depicting the sources of the materials used by jewellers, with a seventh medallion on the north facade. These medallions depict turquoise (representing semi-precious stones), an elephant (representing ivory), a Kimberley Negro] searching for diamonds, a man diving for pearls, an oceanic wave delivering the riches of the sea (mother-of-pearl, coral and a tortoise shell), a precious metal-smelting gnome, and a silversmith surrounded by the tools of his trade. Above the medallions is a frieze depicting such characters and places as King Solomon, the Queen of Sheba, gates of Jerusalem, Hiram, king of Tyre, Negroes and an Indian, and the three wise men giving and receiving gifts. $150,000 of alterations to the ground-floor show-window area in 1951 included a granite base and Tyndall stone facings surrounding the solid bronze show windows, as well as corner columns and vestibule walls lined with Travertine marble. The building was the Winnipeg showpiece for Birks for nearly eighty years. By 1991, the basement, first, second and third floors had all been substantially altered by the Birks Company, leaving only the fourth floor of dormitories unaltered from YMCA's era. Birks continued in this building until the 1987 when it moved to 191 Lombard Avenue, entrance on corner of Main Street, in the historic Union Tower Building.

Relevance
The Birks building was formally recognized as a Winnipeg Landmark Heritage Structure on 36 October 1999, and was listed on the Canadian Register of Historic Places on 31 August 2004.

In 2006, it was redeveloped into a modern office building, built to the Leadership in Energy and Environmental Design (LEED) Silver standard. The building reopened in 2007 as the home of the Winnipeg Land Titles Office, Surveys Branch, and the Personal Property Registry.

The building retains many distinctive visual elements, including:
 overhanging decorative cornice
 various window shapes, including rectangular on the main floor, arched on the second floor and small rectangular shapes in the attic storey
 all windows outlined with distinct surround treatments
 decorative elements including quoins, niches, and an attic-level frieze
 terracotta colour for the stucco areas contrasting with the cream-coloured terracotta tiles
 north and west facades feature medallions depicting sources of materials used by jewellers
 Birks company logo in terracotta and tile on the west facade and painted wall signage on the east

References

Buildings and structures in downtown Winnipeg
Cultural infrastructure completed in 1901
YMCA buildings
Italianate architecture in Canada
Municipal Historical Resources of Winnipeg